Philipp Charles, Count of Erbach-Fürstenau (14 September 1677 – 2 June 1736), was a member of the German House of Erbach who held the fiefs of Fürstenau, Michelstadt and Breuberg.

Born in Schönberg, he was the third child and second (but eldest surviving) son of George Albert II, Count of Erbach-Fürstenau and Anna Dorothea Christina, a daughter of Count Philipp Gottfried of Hohenlohe-Waldenburg.

Life

Like several others members of his family, Philipp Charles pursued a military career, and became General-major of the Franconian Circle.

After the death of his father in 1717, he ruled jointly with his brothers over all their inheritance, although he managed to kept the sole government over him. In 1718 he became sovereign Lord of Breuberg.

Philipp Charles died in Fürstenau aged 58 and was buried in Michelstadt.

He married Charlotte Amalie of Kunowitz and had issue:
 Countess Caroline of Erbach-Fürstenau 1700–1758, married to Ernest Frederick II, Duke of Saxe-Hildburghausen.

Notes

Counts of Germany
House of Erbach
1677 births
1736 deaths
18th-century German people